Eurylomia cordula is a moth of the subfamily Arctiinae first described by Jean Baptiste Boisduval in 1870. It is found in Mexico and Honduras.

References

Lithosiini